Laboratoria Fantastiki, or FantLab ("speculative fiction laboratory"), is a Russian website dedicated to science fiction and fantasy literature. It was founded in 2004 by Alexei Lvov.

Content
The website contains an extensive user-populated database of books, annotations, and reviews. Unregistered users have access to author pages, ratings, news and awards. If users sign up, they can review and rate books, generate reading lists. They can also create their own bookshelves and publish articles. In June 2013, the site had over 88,000 members and over 244,000 works by authors had been added. In April, 2012, the 2000th author (Murray Leinster) was added to the database.

Fantlab calls its mission:
To compile bibliographies for any author writing in Science Fiction or Fantasy genres, complete with maximum information about the author, and his or hers biography, including awards and nominations.
Fair rating for books and authors based on reader votes and book reviews.
Recommended titles list, based on individual profiling.
Classification system for books and titles.
Publishers plans, rumors and gossip.
Special awards and recognition
Personal Articles published by Authors
User forums where literature related interests can be discussed
FantLab is not an electronic library, that's why the texts of literary works can not be downloaded.

Author's pages
Collected information for Russian and non-Russian writers is presented on Author's pages. Each author’s page will have biography completed with photos and bibliography. Bibliography is a compiled list of known published and unpublished works, derived from multiple sources by comparisons and additions that characterize its reliability.
All author’s works are categorized into cycles, series and epics. Each will have publishing editions information along with edition’s detail.
Each item in bibliography displays average rating, count of readers and number of reviews.
Any title’s page reflects number of people who read and rated it, an average rating, annotation, comments or synopsis, listing of parent series, epics, collections or anthologies and awards where applicable. Title’s page will also contain any available information for published editions, including cover images, sorted by year and divided between Russian and non-Russian editions.

Awards and Recognition pages
FantLab  is tracking all of notable international literary awards such as Locus Award, Hugo Award, Pulitzer,  World Fantasy Award and others.
In 2007 as popularity of the site grew and number of daily visitors reached approximately 4 thousand a day, Fantlab decided to implement a voting system that allowed nomination of popular and best reviewed books, this resulted in FantLab's Book of the Year Award.  It is given annually for the best science fiction or fantasy works of the previous year.

Recommendations
Recommendations are a list of titles suggested for reading. Fantlab's recommendation system prognoses how reader will feel about an unread title. To get it, think-alike ratings and titles are analyzed, averaged in weight measures of equal measures of likeness. Resulting recommendations are based on one or more similar ratings.
On recommendations page you will see maximum of 3 series, 10 novels, and 10 short stories that reader is most likely to like.

Rating System
System creates ratings of writers and works based on readers ratings.
Ratings will be derived by average reader rating of the title and calculated by a complex statistical correlation formulas.

Invisible Connections
Invisible Connections are a result of correlation analysis based on rated titles. When a user is registered, this section will display pairs of users with highest positive (think-alikes) and lowest negative (antipodes) coefficient of correlation.

Author's journal
Fantlab is also an online magazine, published on the Internet through bulletin board system. Fantlab's writers journal includes various news, announcements, reviews and articles. Authors publish their works through their blogs http://fantlab.ru/blogs. Subscribers of the blogs are notified of new publications. All specialty blog 'Columns' are administered by an individual editorial panel. Any registered of FantLab user can create a blog column and publish their work. Among authors currently publishing their work on FantLab are well-known writers and journalists like, Vadim Panov, Alexey Pehov, Vladimir Puziy, and many others.

FantLab's awards and recognition
In 2009, site received "Mech Fantastiki" award on a "Strannik" congress.
In 2010, site received a prize "the Internet-Roscon" on a Roscon convent.
In 2010, site was nominated on Eurocon prize for best magazines 
In 2011, site won Eurocon prize for best magazines

See also 
Russian science fiction and fantasy

References

External links
Information about this site in English

Russian literature websites
Russian speculative fiction
Ukrainian speculative fiction
Internet properties established in 2004
Speculative fiction websites